The Stolpersteine in Prague-Vršovice and Modřany lists the Stolpersteine in the town quarters Vršovice (Praha 10) and Modřany (Praha 12). Stolpersteine is the German name for stumbling blocks collocated all over Europe by German artist Gunter Demnig. They remember the fate of the Nazi victims being murdered, deported, exiled or driven to suicide.

Generally, the stumbling blocks are posed in front of the building where the victims had their last self chosen residence. The name of the Stolpersteine in Czech is: Kameny zmizelých.

Praha 10: Vršovice

Praha 12: Modřany

Dates of collocations 
According to the website of Gunter Demnig the Stolpersteine of Prague were posed on 8 October 2008, 7 November 2009, 12 June 2010, 13 to 15 June 2011 and on 17 July 2013 by the artist himself. Another collocation, not credited on Demnig's website, took place on 28 October 2012.

The Czech Stolperstein project was initiated in 2008 by the Česká unie židovské mládeže (Czech Union of Jewish Youth) and was realized with the patronage of the Mayor of Prague.

See also 
 List of cities by country that have stolpersteine
 Stolpersteine in the Czech Republic

External links

 stolpersteine.eu, Demnig's website
 holocaust.cz

References

Vršovice and Modřany